Oceans Apart is the ninth and final studio album by The Go-Betweens, released in 2005. All the songs were written by Grant McLennan and Robert Forster. The album was recorded at the Good Luck Studios in London between November 2004 through to January 2005, except for "Boundary Rider" which was recorded at The White Room Recording Studio in Brisbane.

Details
The live recordings on the bonus disc were recorded at The Barbican Concert Hall, London on 27 June 2004.

The album won the 2005 "Adult Contemporary Album" award at the 2005 ARIA music awards.

Many reviews and fans complained of the aggressively loud and distorted mastering of the initial release by Jon Astley to the extent that Lo-Max offered to exchange the original pressing for a newer release where the problem is less evident.

Forster later claimed "Darlinghurst Nights" was the song he was most pleased with writing throughout his career. He said "I loved writing the lyric, and I could just get all these people in - Frank Brunetti, who used to be in Died Pretty and was a music journalist on  RAM; Clinton Walker is in it. It's a song that no-one else could have written but me - for better or worse."

McLennan said, "We didn't want to be on the outer ripples of the pond anymore. We wanted to jump back into the maelstrom – London, just the energy, the competition of the place. We've made enough records and have listened to enough records by other people that we know this is a fucking good one."

Reception
 The site named it the 22nd-best reviewed album of 2005.

Track listing
 "Here Comes a City" – 3:25
 "Finding You" – 4:02
 "Born to a Family" – 3:08
 "No Reason to Cry" – 3:53
 "Boundary Rider" – 2:45
 "Darlinghurst Nights" – 6:18
 "Lavender" – 3:09
 "The Statue" – 4:25
 "This Night's for You" – 4:25
 "The Mountains Near Dellray" – 3:28

Bonus disc
 "People Say" (Live) – 3:31
 "He Lives My Life" (Live) – 4:03
 "The Wrong Road" (Live) – 5:17
 "Bye Bye Pride" (Live) – 4:54
 "When People Are Dead" (Live) – 4:45
 "Streets of Your Town" (Live) – 3:36

Personnel

Go-Betweens
 Robert Forster – vocals, guitars, piano, organ
 Grant McLennan – vocals, guitars
 Adele Pickvance – bass, keyboards, backing vocals
 Glenn Thompson – drums, keyboards, guitar, backing vocals

Additional musicians
 Tom Rees-Roberts – flugelhorn
 Trevor Miles – trombone
 David Powell – tuba
 Duncan Lamont – clarinet
 Dave Ruffy – keyboards, percussion

References

External links
 More reviews

The Go-Betweens albums
2005 albums
ARIA Award-winning albums